"Down" is a song by American nu metal band Motograter. The song was released as the second single from the band's self-titled debut.

Music video
A music video was produced for the song and was directed by Sean Odell.

Chart positions

Personnel
 Ivan "Ghost" Moody – vocals
 Matt "Nuke" Nunes – guitar
 J.R. Swartz – guitar
 Bruce "Grater" Butler – motogtater
 Chris "Crispy" Binns – drums
 Joey "Smur" Krzywonski – percussion
 Zak "The Waz" Ward – samples

References

2003 singles
Elektra Records singles
Motograter songs
2003 songs